4th Earl of Orford may refer to:

 Horace Walpole (1717–1797), later the Earl of Orford, English art historian, man of letters, antiquarian and Whig politician
 Horatio Walpole, 4th Earl of Orford (second creation) (1813–1894), British peer and Conservative politician